Schizocyathidae is a family of stony corals. There are currently three genera included in this family and each of them is monotypic. Members of the family are azooxanthellate, deep water species.

Genera
The World Register of Marine Species includes the following genera in the family:

Genus Pourtalocyathus Cairns, 1979
Species Pourtalocyathus hispidus (Pourtalès, 1878)
Genus Schizocyathus Pourtalès, 1874
Species Schizocyathus fissilis Pourtalès, 1874
Genus Temnotrochus Cairns, 1995
Species Temnotrochus kermadecensis Cairns, 1995

References

 
Scleractinia
Cnidarian families